Republic road I-3 is a major road in Northern Bulgaria. It runs between I-5 road, at the city of Byala, and I-1 road, at Botevgrad. I-3 road provides one driving lane per direction and it is planned to be superseded by Hemus motorway (A2).

Description
Road I-3 begins from junction with I-5 road, south of Byala, Ruse Province. It runs west through the Danubian Plain and crosses the centres of several villages before reaching Pleven, the seventh largest city in Bulgaria. The road bypasses Pleven from north and then runs southwest. Road I-3 ends at Botevgrad.

References

External links
Road network of Bulgaria at RIA
Detailed road maps of Bulgaria Bulgarian Visitor Information website

Roads in Bulgaria